Women in the Mirror (translit. Kagami no onnatachi) is a 2002 Japanese drama film directed by Yoshishige Yoshida. It was screened out of competition at the 2002 Cannes Film Festival.

Cast
 Mariko Okada - Ai Kawase
 Yoshiko Tanaka - Masako
 Sae Isshiki - Natsuki
 Hideo Murota - Goda
 HIroshi Inuzuka
 Tokuma Nishioka - The Protector
 Mirai Yamamoto - The Journalist
 Miki Sanjo - The Old Woman
 Hiroshi Inuzuka - The Old Man

References

External links

2002 films
2000s Japanese-language films
2002 drama films
Films directed by Yoshishige Yoshida
Films about the atomic bombings of Hiroshima and Nagasaki
2000s Japanese films